That's Life! (stylised thats life! and usually abbreviated to TL!) is an Australian entertainment and lifestyle weekly magazine by Are Media. It is not related to the United Kingdom magazine publication of the same title, which is published by Bauer Media Group. TL! is a reality-based magazine, with most stories contributed by its readers as well as containing puzzles, recipes, health, beauty and fashion advice.

In January 2019, that's life! added a monthly edition of the magazine to its publication schedule. The magazine also produces a podcast titled "How I Survived."

References

External links
 

1994 establishments in Australia
Are Media
Entertainment magazines
Magazines established in 1994
Magazines published in Sydney
Weekly magazines published in Australia
Women's magazines published in Australia